Waqt ki Awaz ('Voice of Time') was a Hindi language weekly newspaper, published from Hissar, Haryana, India. The newspaper was founded in 1953. It was printed at Subhas Printing Press.

References

Newspapers established in 1953
Defunct Hindi-language newspapers
Weekly newspapers published in India
1953 establishments in India